Kaamam Krodham Moham (Lust, Anger, Greed) is a 1975 Indian Malayalam film, directed and produced by Madhu. The film stars Madhu, Jayabharathi, Nanditha Bose, Kallayam Krishnadas and Manavalan Joseph in the lead roles. The film has musical score by Shyam.

Cast
 
Madhu 
Jayabharathi 
Nanditha Bose
Kallayam Krishnadas
Manavalan Joseph 
Muthukulam Raghavan Pillai 
Pattom Sadan 
Sankaradi 
Shobha 
Baby Jayarani
Kottarakkara Sreedharan Nair 
Kuttan
Nanditha Bose 
P. K. Abraham 
Pushpa
K. V. Shanthi 
Sudevan
T. P. Madhavan

Soundtrack

The music was composed by Shyam and the lyrics were written by Bharanikkavu Sivakumar and Bichu Thirumala.

References

External links
 

1975 films
1970s Malayalam-language films